Mahmoud Guendouz (born February 24, 1953 in El Harrach) is an Algerian former footballer and coach.

A stalwart of the Algerian national team during its greatest period on the world stage, he appeared at the 1980 Olympics as well as the FIFA World Cups of 1982 and 1986. As a club player he was largely based in his homeland, although he also appeared for FC Martigues in France.

Career
Guendouz played every minute of Algeria's World Cup finals campaign of 1982 and was solid in a campaign in which les Fennecs won two games out of three and only missed out on the second round due to goal difference. He did blot his copy book, however, with a foul on Patricio Yáñez in the game against Chile, with Miguel Ángel Neira scoring from the resulting penalty. He also featured in every minute of the country's less impressive 1986 finals campaign.

After retiring from the game, Guendouz entered into football management. He was joint manager of Martigues with Yves Herbet in 1998-99 then sole manager for a spell from 1999 to 2000. Later he would go on to manage Algerian club side US Biskra.

References

External links
 

1953 births
Living people
People from El Harrach
Algerian footballers
Association football defenders

JS El Biar players
FC Martigues players
NA Hussein Dey players
Ligue 2 players

Algerian expatriate footballers
Expatriate footballers in France
Algerian expatriate sportspeople in France

Algeria international footballers
1982 FIFA World Cup players
1986 FIFA World Cup players
Olympic footballers of Algeria
Footballers at the 1980 Summer Olympics
1980 African Cup of Nations players
1984 African Cup of Nations players
1986 African Cup of Nations players
Mediterranean Games bronze medalists for Algeria
Competitors at the 1979 Mediterranean Games
Competitors at the 1983 Mediterranean Games
Mediterranean Games medalists in football

Algerian football managers
Al Jazira Club managers
FC Martigues managers
US Biskra managers
Nejmeh SC managers
NA Hussein Dey managers
Lebanese Premier League managers
Algerian expatriate football managers
Expatriate football managers in the United Arab Emirates
Expatriate football managers in Bahrain
Expatriate football managers in France
Expatriate football managers in Lebanon
Expatriate football managers in the State of Palestine
Algerian expatriate sportspeople in the State of Palestine
Algerian expatriate sportspeople in the United Arab Emirates
Algerian expatriate sportspeople in Bahrain
Algerian expatriate sportspeople in Lebanon
21st-century Algerian people